Sepehr is a Persian name. It may also refer to:

 Sepehr (radar), over-the-horizon radar produced by Iran
 Sepehr Tower,  building in Tehran, Iran
 Isfahan Sepehr College, educational institution in Isfahan, Iran